Austropetalia patricia is a species of dragonfly of the family Austropetaliidae, 
commonly known as the waterfall redspot. 
It is endemic to eastern New South Wales, Australia, where it inhabits mountain streams.
It is a medium-sized dragonfly with brown and yellow markings.

Gallery

See also
 List of Odonata species of Australia

References

Austropetaliidae
Odonata of Australia
Insects of Australia
Endemic fauna of Australia
Taxa named by Robert John Tillyard
Insects described in 1910